In mathematics, the Burchnall–Chaundy theory of commuting linear ordinary differential operators was introduced by .

One of the main results says that two commuting differential operators satisfy a non-trivial algebraic relation.
The polynomial relating the two commuting differential operators is called the Burchnall–Chaundy polynomial.

References

Ordinary differential equations